Antilleptostylus nigricans is a species of longhorn beetles of the subfamily Lamiinae, and the only species in the genus Antilleptostylus. It was described by Fisher in 1935.

References

Acanthocinini
Beetles described in 1935
Monotypic Cerambycidae genera